Ecpyrrhorrhoe diffusalis is a species of moth in the family Crambidae. It is found in France, Spain, Switzerland, Italy, on the Balkan Peninsula and in Turkey.

The wingspan is about 22 mm.

References

Moths described in 1854
Pyraustinae
Moths of Europe